Hornachuelos is a city located in the province of Córdoba, Spain. According to the 2006 census (INE), the city has a population of 4662 inhabitants.

The first scene of Act II of Giuseppe Verdi's La forza del destino takes place in "an inn at Hornachuelos".

References

External links
Hornachuelos - Sistema de Información Multiterritorial de Andalucía

Municipalities in the Province of Córdoba (Spain)